Serge Lairle (born Toulouse, 3 December 1956) is a French rugby union former footballer and a current coach. He played as a prop, lock and hooker.

He played for Stade Toulousain, from 1975/76 to 1989/90, when he finished his career. He played also for France XV.

He was the coach of several teams in France. Lairle was nominated head coach of Romania in 2009. He had a disappointing 2011 Rugby World Cup qualification, reaching only the 3rd place and failing the direct qualifying for the first time but still reaching the repechage. He was replaced by Romeo Gontineac in 2010.

External links
Serge Lairle Data

1956 births
Living people
French rugby union players
French rugby union coaches
Rugby union props
Rugby union hookers
Rugby union locks
Stade Toulousain players
Romania national rugby union team coaches